Birgitte, Duchess of Gloucester,  (born Birgitte Eva van Deurs Henriksen; 20 June 1946) is a Danish member of the British royal family. She is married to Prince Richard, Duke of Gloucester, a grandson of George V. They have three children.

Early life and education
Birgitte was born Birgitte Eva van Deurs Henriksen, in Odense, Denmark, the younger daughter of Asger Preben Wissing Henriksen, a lawyer, and his wife, Vivian van Deurs. She was educated in Odense and at finishing schools in Lausanne and Cambridge. She took her mother's ancestral name van Deurs on 15 January 1966, after her parents' separation. After completing a three-year course in Commercial and Economic Studies in Copenhagen, she moved back to the United Kingdom in 1971 to work as a secretary at the Royal Danish Embassy in London.

Marriage and family

Birgitte first met Prince Richard of Gloucester, the younger son of Prince Henry, Duke of Gloucester, and Princess Alice, Duchess of Gloucester, in the late 1960s in Cambridge, where he attended university. In February 1972, their engagement was announced. They married on 8 July 1972 at St Andrew's Church, Barnwell, Northamptonshire. The bride's wedding dress was designed by Norman Hartnell. Instead of wearing a tiara, the bride wore stephanotis flowers on her hair which secured the veil.

Six weeks after their wedding, Prince Richard's elder brother, Prince William of Gloucester, was killed in a flying accident. Prince Richard unexpectedly became heir apparent to the dukedom and upon his father's death in 1974, the couple became the Duke and Duchess of Gloucester.

The couple have three children: Alexander (born 1974), Davina (born 1977), and Rose (born 1980). They were born at St Mary's Hospital, London. The Duke and Duchess officially reside at Kensington Palace.

Activities

The Duchess of Gloucester has accompanied the Duke of Gloucester on his official visits overseas: her first visit was in 1973, when they represented the Queen at the 70th birthday celebrations of King Olav V of Norway. Other joint visits have included Australia, Belgium, China, Denmark, Gibraltar, Hong Kong, Israel, Japan, Luxembourg, Nepal, New Zealand, Norway, Philippines, Portugal, Saudi Arabia, Singapore, Solomon Islands, South Africa, Spain, Sweden, Tonga, Tunisia and the United States. Birgitte has also travelled overseas in support of her own patronages and military units, including a visit to Iraq in December 2008.

She and her husband represented the Queen and the Duke of Edinburgh at the state funeral of King Tāufaāhau Tupou IV of Tonga on 19 September 2006. They also represented the Queen and the Duke of Edinburgh at the coronation of King George Tupou V of Tonga on 1 August 2008 in Nukuʻalofa.

She is also the royal patron of the Bermuda Regiment. She is patron of SeeAbility, a charity for people with learning disabilities and sight loss; The Lullaby Trust, a baby charity aiming to prevent unexpected deaths in infancy and promote infant health; and Music in Hospitals & Care. She regularly attends functions at schools of which she is president or patron: St Paul's Cathedral School; the Friends of St Paul's Cathedral; the Cathedral Music Trust; St John's School, Leatherhead; Bridewell Royal Hospital (King Edward's School, Witley); the Royal Alexandra and Albert School; the Children's Society; Parkinson's UK; Hope for Youth Northern Ireland; Scottish Opera; Lawn Tennis Association; the Royal School of Needlework; Turn2us; Missing People; and Princess Helena College. After the death of Diana, Princess of Wales, Birgitte became president of the Royal Academy of Music. She is also the patron of Prostate Cancer UK, and in March 2006, she opened the Prostate Centre.

Honours

  1973: Royal Family Order of Queen Elizabeth II
  1975: Dame of Justice of the Order of St. John
  1975: Service Medal of the Order of St John
  6 February 1977: Queen Elizabeth II Silver Jubilee Medal
  1978: Solomon Islands Independence Medal
  23 June 1989: Dame Grand Cross of the Royal Victorian Order (GCVO)
  6 February 2002: Queen Elizabeth II Golden Jubilee Medal
  2018: Canadian Forces Decoration (CD)

Foreign
  1 August 2008: Dame Grand Cross of the Order of the Crown of Tonga
  3 March 2015: Sash of the Order of the Aztec Eagle

Honorary military appointments
 Australia
  Colonel-in-Chief, of the Royal Australian Army Educational Corps

 Bermuda
  Colonel-in-Chief, of the Royal Bermuda Regiment

 Canada
   Colonel-in-Chief of the Royal Canadian Dental Corps (January 2006 – present)

 New Zealand 
  Colonel-in-Chief, of the Royal New Zealand Army Educational Corps

 United Kingdom
  Colonel-in-Chief, of the Royal Army Dental Corps
  Deputy Colonel-in-Chief, of the Adjutant General's Corps
  Royal Colonel, of the 7th (V) Battalion The Rifles
  Lady Sponsor, of 
  Lady Sponsor, of

Arms

Issue

References

External links

 The Duchess of Gloucester at the Royal Family website
 

1946 births
Living people
Gloucester
British people of Dutch descent
Dames Grand Cross of the Order of St John
Dames Grand Cross of the Royal Victorian Order
Dames Grand Cross of the Order of the Crown of Tonga
Danish emigrants to England
Danish nobility
Danish people of Dutch descent
Birgitte
People associated with the Royal Academy of Music
People from Odense
Wives of British princes
Wives of knights